Tonhon Chonlatee is a 2020 Thai television series starring Suphakorn Sriphothong (Pod) and Thanawat Rattanakitpaisarn (Khaotung).

Directed by Ekkasit Trakulkasemsuk and produced by GMMTV together with Keng Kwang Kang, the series is one of the two television series launched by GMMTV together with AIS Play on 8 July 2020. The series premiered on GMM 25 and AIS Play on 13 November 2020, airing on Fridays at 21:30 ICT.

This serves as a reunion project for Thanawat Rattanakitpaisarn (Khaotung), Jirakit Kuariyakul (Toptap), Chinnarat Siripongchawalit (Mike), Sivakorn Lertchuchot (Guy) and Chanagun Arpornsutinan (Gunsmile) after their successful roles as Fong, Type, Man, Dim and Boss respectively in the hit phenomenal boys' love series 2gether: The Series, wherein the said series was also featured in Episode 9 of the series.

Plot 
Chonlatee (Thanawat Rattanakitpaisarn) is a shy, kind-hearted boy, who has a crush secretly on Tonhon (Supakorn Sriphotong), the guy next door, since their childhood days. Tonhon has always taken care of him as if they were real "brothers". But Chonlatee watching Tonhon and his girlfriend Amp from a distance. That is until destiny favors him when Tonhon updates his status as single. Chonlatee then decides to change his look to get Tonhon's attention and love.

Their closeness starts to change into a deeper bond. Tonhon starts to get confused about his feelings. His mouth keeps saying that he doesn't think of Chonlatee that way but when Chonlatee goes out with someone else, he feels insecure, being possessive and worried about Chonlatee. And in the midst of that, his ex-girlfriend, Amp, returns to pursue Tonhon's feelings back.

Cast and characters 
The cast of the series are:

Main 
 Suphakorn Sriphothong (Pod) as Tonhon/Ton - Chonlatee's childhood best friend who he's pretending that Chonlatee is just a "brother" to him.
 Thanawat Rattanakitpaisarn (Khaotung) as Chonlatee/Chon - Tonhon's childhood best friend who has had a secret crush on Tonhon since their childhood.

Supporting 
 Jirakit Kuariyakul (Toptap) as Ai - Ni's boyfriend and Tonhon's best friend and housemate
 Chinnarat Siripongchawalit (Mike) as Ni - Ai's boyfriend and Tonhon's best friend and housemate
 Phatchara Tubthong (Kapook) as Amp - Tonhon's ex-girlfriend
 Apichaya Saejung (Ciize) as Pang - Chonlatee's childhood best friend. 
 Trai Nimtawat (Neo) as Na - Chonlatee and Pang's self-described rich and good-looking friend who has a crush on Chonlatee.
 Ployshompoo Supasap (Jan) as Miriam - a "call girl" helped by Ai and Ni, and a housemate and friend of Chonlatee who is a big fan of boys' love series.
 Chanagun Arpornsutinan (Gunsmile) as Neung - A senior in the campus who has a crush for Chonlatee.
 Wanpiya Oamsinnoppakul (Gwang) as Baipai - Ton's sister and Itt's wife.
 Sivakorn Lertchuchot (Guy) as Itt - Ton's brother-in-law and Baipai's husband.
 Jennifer Kim as Mae Nam - Chon's mother
 Kalaya Lerdkasemsap (Ngek) as Amporn - Ton's mother
 Dilok Thongwattana (Moo) as Chaeron - Ton's father

Guest role 
 Thanathorn Khuankaew (Jom) as Por
 Samitpong Sakulpongchai (Tong) as Ken

Soundtrack

References

External links 
Tonhon Chonlatee on GMM 25 website 
Tonhon Chonlatee (2020) Official Trailer
GMMTV

Television series by GMMTV
2020 Thai television series debuts
Thai romance television series
Thai boys' love television series
GMM 25 original programming
Television series by Keng Kwang Kang
2020s LGBT-related drama television series
2020s LGBT-related comedy television series